Thalakkad  is a census town in Malappuram district in the state of Kerala, India.

Demographics
 India census, Thalakkad had a population of 30577 with 14269 males and 16308 females.
KL-55 is the RTO vehicle registration code of Talakkad Panchayat.

Important places in Thalakkad Panchayath
 B P Angadi town (Bettathu Pudiyangadi)
 Mangattiri bridge at Mangattiri over Tirur River
 B P Angadi is a suburban town of Tirur Municipality. Thalakkad Grama panchayat can be considered as the southern portion of Tirur city.

Wards of Thalakkad
{ "type": "ExternalData",  "service": "geoshape",  "ids": "Q13112400"}
Thalakkad Grama Panchayat is composed of the following 19 wards:

Transportation
Thalakkad village connects to other parts of India through Tirur, Kuttippuram town.  National highway No.66 passes through Tirur and the northern stretch connects to Goa and Mumbai.  The southern stretch connects to Cochin and Trivandrum. Highway No.966 goes to Palakkad and Coimbatore. The nearest airport is at Kozhikode.  The nearest major railway station is at Tirur.

See also
B P Angadi
Thekkan Kuttur
Pullur
Pachattiri
Vettom
Tirur

References

   Cities and towns in Malappuram district
Tirur area